Grim's Ditch, Grim's Dyke (also Grimsdyke or Grimes Dike in derivative names) or Grim's Bank is a name shared by a number of prehistoric bank and ditch linear earthworks across England. They are of different dates and may have had different functions.

Purpose
The purpose of these earthworks remains a mystery, but as they are too small for military use they may have served to demarcate territory. Some of the Grims Ditches may have had multiple functions.

Etymology
The name "Grim's Ditch" is Old English in origin. The Anglo-Saxon word dīc was pronounced "deek" in northern England and "deetch" in the south. The method of building this type of earthwork involved digging a trench and forming the upcast soil into a bank alongside it. This practice has resulted in the name dīc being given to either the trench or the bank, and this evolved into two words, ditch and dyke in modern British English.

The origin of the name Grim is shrouded in mystery, but there are several theories as to its origin. Many ancient earthworks of this name exist across England and Wales, pre-dating the Anglo Saxon settlement of Britain. It was common for the Anglo Saxons to name features of unexplained or mysterious origin Grim. Most scholars believe that the name derives from the Old Norse word Grimr, an Anglo-Saxon alias for the Norse God of War and Magic, Wōden (called Odin by the Norse) and meaning "the masked one". The name of Wōden is thought by some historians to be evident in Wansdyke, an ancient earthwork of uncertain origin which runs from Wiltshire to Somerset. The historian W. H. Stevenson draws a link between Grim, the Saxon alias for Wōden, and the name of Grim's Dyke:

Frank Stenton notes that there is no direct evidence that Wōden was known in England as Grim, but (citing supporting claims by Professor Eilert Ekwall) states that it was very probable. He mentions three sites named Grimes Wrosen: one outside Colchester in Essex; another in Warwickshire on the route of the Roman road Watling Street; and Credenhill in Herefordshire. These earthworks, Stenton asserts, were either considered to have been the supernatural work of Wōden himself, or sites connected strongly with the cult of Wōden where the Anglo-Saxons worshipped the god. Among Woden's many roles is that of a god of war, and it may be that the Anglo-Saxons perceived the earthworks as military in function and therefore ascribed them to him.

Another suggested origin of Grim may be in the Celtic name Grin or Gryn (Gryan in Irish, a putative origin of the name Ryan), a signifier of the Sun as a divinity.

The identities of Wōden and the Devil have also become conflated, as evidenced in the number of earthworks named after the Devil. As the Anglo-Saxon population converted to the new religion of Christianity, baptised converts renounced the old Saxon Gods along with the works of the Devil. It is thought that, as a result of this Christianisation, place names and features once associated with pre-Christian deities then came to be associated with the Devil. The names Grim, Graeme and Graham are closely connected and many British family and place names have been linked with the etymology of Wōden/Grim/Devil: Grimsby (residence of the Devil), Grimsthorpe (Village of the Devil), Grimshaw (the Devil's Wood), reflected in the use of dragon emblems in heraldry associated with Grim- names. Earthworks bearing names related to Grim or the Devil proliferate around Britain: Grim's Ditches exist in Berkshire, Buckinghamshire, Hampshire, Hertfordshire, Oxfordshire and West Yorkshire, and Devil's Dykes exist in Sussex, Cambridgeshire, Norfolk (near Weeting) and Hertfordshire. The Antonine Wall which once separated Scotland from Roman Britain is also sometimes known as Graham's Dyke. In Suffolk, a large Neolithic flint mine is known by the name of Grimes Graves.

Beyond Britain, a set of Roman Limes on the borders of Hungary, Romania and Serbia are sometimes known as the Devil's Dykes in Hungarian.

Berkshire

At Park Piece there are  number of earthworks and Grim's Bank changes direction or may be a separate monument. Excavations in 1978 suggested there were two different earthworks and were most likely to be Iron Age in date. These two parts of Grim's Bank are referred to as Grim's Bank I and Grim's Bank II.

There is another Grim's Bank running south of Aldworth and Streatley. Excavations have shown that the ditch is not earlier than the third century AD.

Buckinghamshire 

There are three sections of the Chiltern Grim's Ditch in Buckinghamshire:

 A substations section from Park Wood to Hampden House
 Missenden Valley to the Lea
 From King's Ash to county boundary where it continues into Hertfordshire

It is not known if these sections of ditch were once a continuous feature or were built at separate times and had different functions. These sections are most likely to be of Iron Age date.

Essex 
Gryme's Dyke, a Scheduled Ancient Monument, is one of a number of large linear earthwork dykes around the oppidium at Colchester. Most of the dykes were built in the late Iron Age to define and protect the important settlement centre of Camulodunum (Colchester), though some can be dated to the early Roman period which is probably when Gryme’s Dyke was constructed. The official scheduling says:

"The monument includes the buried and upstanding remains of the middle part of a late Iron Age or Romano-British linear boundary earthwork (Gryme's Dyke) located some 3.5km WSW of Colchester town centre."

"Fragments of pottery and a copied coin of the Emperor Claudius allow the bank to be tentatively dated to the period AD 40-75, perhaps constructed on the eve of the Roman conquest (AD 43), but more probably later and possibly as late as the aftermath of the Boudiccan revolt (AD 60-61)."

Greater London 

Grim's Ditch also called  Grim's Dyke stretches from Harrow Weald to Bushey Heath on the north western edge of Greater London. It extends for some 3 km but has been badly damaged by housing development in the twentieth century. The earthwork runs just south of the former county boundary between Hertfordshire and Middlesex. There is another earthwork close by in Pear Wood, Brockley Hill that has been suggested as an eastern continuation of the Grim's Dyke. This monument is of Roman or post-Roman date and runs at ninety degrees to Watling Street.

A nearby house built in 1870-72, Grim's Dyke (sometimes also called Graeme's Dyke), was named after the earthworks. The large Victorian Gothic mansion was once the home of the opera librettist W. S. Gilbert and is now operated as a hotel.  Excavations in the ground of the Grim's Dyke Hotel in 1979 suggested Grim's Dyke was earlier in date than the Pear Wood monument.

Hampshire 
It crosses the present county boundary into Wiltshire. The Royal Commission's survey of Bokerley Dyke disputed the idea of Grim's Ditch being a single monument, and suggested it was a complex of separate sections. English Heritage's monument scheduling suggests that Grim's Ditch may be of Bronze Age or Early Iron Age date.

Another can be found in west Hampshire, midway between the villages of Upton and Netherton.

Hertfordshire 

The route of the Grim's Ditch in Hertfordshire passes through the town of Berkhamsted, and remnants of the earthwork can be seen on Berkhamsted Common. The Historic Environment Record for Hertfordshire suggests that the section on Berkhamsted Common is of  Iron Age or early Roman date for the monument is most likely than the Bronze Age (date suggested for the rest of Grim's Ditch because it is larger here and does not follow the contours of the landscape like the rest of Grim's Ditch.

Oxfordshire

There are three linear earthworks in Oxfordshire that are called Grim's Ditch.

The south Oxfordshire Grim's Ditch, also known as the Mongewell Ditch is a  section between Mongewell on the banks of the Thames near Wallingford, and Hayden Farm near Nettlebed in the Chilterns escarpment. Part of the western end was excavated during the building of Winterbrook Bridge, and dated as late Iron Age/early Roman. The ditch has a bank on the north side which suggests that its function was to bar passage into the southernmost part of Oxfordshire.

Considering the location of the ditch across the Chiltern Clayland, it is possible that the ditch could have functioned to block movement into Oxfordshire up the Thames valley. The heavier soils behind the ditch are far easier to move over, creating a solid defensive position. However, since a neighbouring set of earthworks, Streatly Ditches, faces north, it would be difficult to come to the conclusion that the two create a barrier against movement up the Thames valley. Furthermore, it could be argued that there is a possibility that people could simply cross the river at Streatley and just avoid both dykes altogether.

In terms of dating, one of the few finds on the site is a coin, dateable to the beginning of the 1st century BC. The ditch can also be compared to the identically-arranged Chichester Entrenchments, dating the ditch to around the Iron Age. The soil composition shows light soils being cleared for tillage and sheep, and clays bearing forest for raising animals, which is also characteristic of the Iron Age.

There is another separate set of earthworks known as the north Oxfordshire Grim's Ditch to the northwest of Oxford. There are a whole series of discontinuous earthworks with gaps between them. The whole complex covers an area of around 80 km2. There are two circuits of earthworks whose relationship is unknown.  Excavation has shown the earthworks were built in the late Iron Age and went out of use by the Roman period. There is a suggestion that the earthworks are part of an oppida but if this is the case then it would be the largest one in Britain.

The north Oxfordshire Grim's Ditch is visible as a shallow ditch and a raised area south of North Leigh (accessible from the New Yatt footpath), in the woods west of Stonesfield (near the Blenheim Park boundary wall), running north near Grim's Dyke Farm at Glympton Assets, in the woods to the north of Glympton Assets and south-east of Ditchley Park.

A third Grim's Ditch is found on the Berkshire Downs and lies north of the county boundary between Oxfordshire and West Berkshire, running for   near the Ridgeway, above the Oxfordshire villages of Ardington, Hendred and Chilton. This is thought to be of late Bronze Age date.

West Yorkshire 
The West Yorkshire Grim’s Ditch was recognised in the 1970s through the work of Dr Margaret Faull on the place names of West Yorkshire. It had escaped the attention of Yorkshire antiquarians because of the poor state of preservation. The Grim’s Ditch runs north to south between Leeds and Castleford with the ditch is the eastern side. Late medieval documents only refer to the northern section as Grim’s Ditch. The Grim’s Ditch needed substantial effort to build as the ditch was cut into the shale bedrock in parts. Radiocarbon dates from material excavated during archaeological work on the A1 (M) upgrading showed the Grim's Ditch was probably Iron Age in date with possible Roman reuse.

Locations

British National Grid references

See also
Anglo-Saxon paganism
Devil's Dyke, Cambridgeshire, an earthen barrier in eastern Cambridgeshire
Devil's Dyke, Hertfordshire, a prehistoric defensive ditch in Hertfordshire
Toponymy of England

Notes

References

Henig, M, Booth, P. and Allen, T. (2000) Roman Oxfordshire, Sutton Publ, 244 p, 
Sauer, E. (1999) "Middleton Stoney/Upper Heyford, Aves Ditch, earthwork and tribal boundary of the Iron Age", South Midland Archaeol., 29, 65–69

Archaeological sites in England
Archaeological sites in Berkshire
Archaeological sites in Hampshire
Archaeological sites in Oxfordshire
Ancient dikes
Linear earthworks